But I'm Not Wrong is a stand-up comedy special by American comedian Bill Maher. The special aired on HBO in 2010. It was filmed at the Progress Energy Center for the Performing Arts in Raleigh, North Carolina, and premiered on February 13, 2010.

Maher covered various political and social topics such as Barack Obama, the Tea Party movement, the economy, drugs, terrorism, war, and religion.

The special was released on DVD on September 14, 2010.

It was nominated at the 62nd Primetime Emmy Awards for Outstanding Variety, Music or Comedy Special, but lost to the Kennedy Center Honors.

References

2010 television specials
2010s American television specials
HBO network specials
Bill Maher